James Adams (15 January 1811 – 7 November 1851) was an English first-class cricketer. Adams' batting style is unknown, while it is known he occasionally played as a wicket-keeper. He was born at Saffron Walden, Essex.

Adams made his first-class cricket debut for Cambridge Town Club against Cambridge University in May 1830 at the University Ground, Barnwell, where he made 62 runs in Cambridge Town Club's first-innings. He played for the Players in June of that year in the Gentlemen v Players fixture at Lord's Cricket Ground, before making two further first-class appearances for Suffolk, both against the Marylebone Cricket Club in June and August. In his four first-class matches, Adams scored 96 runs at an average of 19.20.

He died at the town of his birth on 7 November 1851.

References

External links

1811 births
1851 deaths
People from Saffron Walden
English cricketers
Cambridge Town Club cricketers
Players cricketers
Suffolk cricketers